

Greenville-Washington, North Carolina Combined Statistical Area 

The Greenville, North Carolina Combined Statistical Area is newly established and is defined by the United States Census Bureau as the Greenville, NC Metropolitan Statistical Area and the Washington, NC Micropolitan Statistical Area. The 2012 population estimate was 220,061.

Counties 
 Pitt
 Beaufort

Cities, Towns, and Communities

Places with 85,000+ inhabitants 
Greenville (Anchor city)

Places with 5,000 - 85,000 inhabitants 
Washington (Secondary city)
Winterville
Farmville

Places with 3,000 - 5,000 inhabitants 
Ayden
River Road

Places with 500 - 3,000 inhabitants 
Belhaven
Bethel
Chocowinity
Grifton (partial)
Snow Hill

Places with less than 500 inhabitants 
Aurora
Bath
Falkland
Fountain
Grimesland
Hookerton
Jason
Pantego
Pinetown
Simpson
Stokes
Walstonburg
Washington Park

References 
1.  2013 US Census Data

Geography of North Carolina
Greenville, North Carolina metropolitan area
Combined statistical areas of the United States